The following is a list of awards and nominations received by American actress Joanne Woodward.

Joanne Woodward is an American actress and producer. One of the best respected actresses of her generation, she became known for playing complex women with a characteristic nuance and depth of character, and became one of the first film stars to have an equally major presence in television. Among her total accolades is an Academy Award, three Primetime Emmy Awards, a British Academy Film Award, three Golden Globe Awards, and a Screen Actors Guild Award.

Woodward is the widow of actor Paul Newman, with whom she often collaborated either as a co-star, or as an actor in films directed or produced by him. Woodward's career is notable not only for its unusual longevity, but for the range and depth of roles which she played. In 1960, she became one of the first people who receive the star on the Hollywood Walk of Fame. In 1993, she was awarded with Kennedy Center Honors.

Woodward is the one of the last major stars from the Golden Age of Hollywood. Upon the death of Olivia de Havilland in July 2020 she became the oldest living Best Actress Academy Award winner.

Woodward, as well as Newman, is a Tony Award away from achieving the Triple Crown of Acting status.

Major associations

Academy Awards

Primetime Emmy Awards

Industry awards

BAFTA Film Awards

Golden Globe Awards

Screen Actors Guild Awards

Independent Spirit Awards

International awards

Cannes Film Festival Awards

San Sebastián International Film Festival Awards

David di Donatello Awards

Critic awards

Other awards

References

Lists of awards received by American actor